Maya Arad (born January 25, 1971) is an American-based Israeli writer. She is generally considered the "foremost Hebrew writer outside Israel".

Biography 
Maya Arad was born in Rishon LeZion in Israel in 1971 and grew up in a kibbutz, Nahal-Oz. At age 11 she returned to her city of birth. Like most Israelis, she served in the Israeli Defense Forces, namely in the Education Corps, where she met her future husband, Reviel Netz, a poet and noted Israeli scholar of the history of pre-modern mathematics, who is currently a professor of Classics and of Philosophy at Stanford University. The couple has two daughters.

Arad earned a B.A. in Classics and Linguistics from Tel-Aviv University and a Ph.D. in linguistics from University of London. She taught at Harvard University, the University of Geneva in Switzerland, and in the theater department at Stanford University. She is a writer-in-residence at the Taube Center for Jewish Studies at Stanford.

Books 
Her first novel, Another Place, a Foreign City (Xargol, 2003), written in verse on the model of Eugene Onegin, became a best-seller in Israel and was adapted as a musical play by the Cameri Theater.

In 2005, she published an academic book, Roots and Patterns: Hebrew Morpho-Syntax, a study of the regularity of the Hebrew verb system. The same year she published The Righteous Forsaken, a play in verse, a reimagining of Griboedov’s "Woe from Wit."

Her novel Seven Moral Failings (Xargol, 2006) was another best-seller. Family Pictures (Xargol, 2008) comprises three novellas. Positions of Stress: Essays on Israeli Literature between Sound and History (Ahuzat Bayit, 2008) was written together with Reviel Netz. Her recent publications are also with Xargol: five novels – Short Story Master (2009), Suspected Dementia (2011), The Maiden of Kazan (2015),,Behind the Mountain (2016), and All about Abigail (2021), as well as a collection of novellas The Hebrew Teacher (2018). The namesake novella of this book was translated into English.

References 

1971 births
Living people
Adi Lautman Interdisciplinary Program for Outstanding Students alumni
Israeli women novelists
Israeli women poets
Israeli poets
Israeli novelists